The 1982–83 Boise State Broncos men's basketball team represented Boise State University during the 1982–83 NCAA Division I men's basketball season. The Broncos were led by third-year head coach Dave Leach and played their home games on campus at the new BSU Pavilion in Boise, Idaho.

With one game remaining, at rival Idaho, athletic director Gene Bleymaier announced in late February that Leach's one-year contract at $33,000 would not be renewed. Bobby Dye of Cal State Bakersfield was hired as head coach in late March 

No Broncos were on the all-conference team; junior swingman Vince Hinchen was named to the second team.

References

External links
Sports Reference – Boise State Broncos – 1982–83 basketball season

Boise State Broncos men's basketball seasons
Boise State
Boise State